Gidami is one of the woredas in the Oromia Region of Ethiopia. It is part of the Kelem Welega Zone. The administrative center of this woreda is Gidami. Dale Sedi was separated from former Jimma Gidami woreda.

Demographics 
The 2007 national census reported a total population for this woreda of 85,904, of whom 43,337 were men and 42,567 were women; 5,602 or 6.52% of its population were urban dwellers. The majority of the inhabitants observed Ethiopian Orthodox Christianity, with 48.88% reporting that as their religion, while 37.22% were Protestants, and 13.75% observed Islam.

Notes 

Districts of Oromia Region